The Municipality of Pandalam also known as Pandalam Municipality (PM) is the civic body that governs Pandalam, the world famous pilgrim town known as the live place of Lord Ayyappa & and it's connection with famous Sabarimala Temple. Pandalam is known as the pilgrim capital of Ayyappa devotees.In every year lakhs of Ayyappa devotees come here to visit Pandalam Ayyappa Temple & Pandalam Palace where Ayyappa lived.Famous Sabarimala Ayyappa Thiruvabharana Procession starts from here. Pandalam Town is situated in Pathanamthitta, Kerala.It is surrounded by other local bodies including Kulanada panchayath , Thumpamon panchayath, Pandalam Thekkekara panchayath (Thattayil)  and Alappuzha district on one side. This is the first ever municipality in Southern Kerala where BJP got power.

Legislative
Pandalam Municipality formed on 2015, November.
As of 2017, the Pandalam Municipality's legislature, consists of 33 members.In 2020 elections BJP won single majority by winning 18 out of 33 seats by threw away CPM & Congress . After formation of new local government in Municipality 2 independent councilors come and join support BJP . That leads BJP to a tally of 20 seats.

See also
Municipal governance in India

References

Municipalities of Kerala